is a railway station on the Hokuriku Main Line in Kaga, Ishikawa, Japan, operated by West Japan Railway Company (JR West).

Lines
It is also scheduled to become a station on the high-speed Hokuriku Shinkansen line when the extension west of  opens around 2025.

Station layout
The station consists of two elevated island platforms with the station building underneath. The station has a Midori no Madoguchi staffed ticket office.

Platforms

History
It was renamed Kagaonsen Station on 1 October 1970. With the privatization of JNR on 1 April 1987, the station came under the control of JR West.

Passenger statistics
In fiscal 2015, the station was used by an average of 2,229 passengers daily (boarding passengers only).

Surrounding area
Yamanaka Onsen
Yamashiro Onsen
Katayamazu Onsen

See also
 List of railway stations in Japan

References

External links

  

Stations of West Japan Railway Company
Railway stations in Ishikawa Prefecture
Railway stations in Japan opened in 1944
Hokuriku Main Line
Kaga, Ishikawa